Delias lytaea  is a butterfly in the family Pieridae. It was described by Frederick DuCane Godman and Osbert Salvin in 1878.
It is endemic to the Bismark archipelago (New Britain, New Ireland and New Georgia).

References

External links

Delias at Markku Savela's Lepidoptera and Some Other Life Forms

lytaea
Butterflies described in 1878
Taxa named by Frederick DuCane Godman
Taxa named by Osbert Salvin